Aşağı Daşağıl (also, Ashaga Dashagi, Ashagi-Dashagyl, and Ashagy-Dashagyl) is a village and municipality in the Shaki Rayon of Azerbaijan.  It has a population of 545.

References 

 

Populated places in Shaki District